Milan Kosanović (1932 – 1989), also known by the nickname of "Milo", was a Yugoslav Serb professional rugby league footballer who played in the 1950s and 1960s.

Background
Milan Kosanović was a Yugoslav Serb born in Lika, in what is now Croatia.  His family relocated from Yugoslavia to the United Kingdom in 1947, where he initially played rugby league in the Halifax junior league, Cyril 1962">Briggs, Cyril & Edwards, Barry (12 May 1962). The Rugby League Challenge Cup Competition - Final Tie - Huddersfield v Wakefield Trinity - Match Programme. Wembley Stadium Ltd. ISBN n/a</ref> Milan Kosanović opened, and was the landlord, of Milan's Wine Bar in Halifax.

Playing career

International honours
Milan Kosanović played  for English League XIII while at Bradford Northern in the 8-26 defeat by France on Saturday 22 November 1958 at Knowsley Road, St. Helens, and was a reserve  for Great Britain.

County honours
Milan Kosanović was selected for Yorkshire County XIII whilst at Bradford Northern during 1959.

Challenge Cup Final appearances
Milan Kosanović played  in Wakefield Trinity's 25-10 victory over Wigan in the 1962–63 Challenge Cup Final during the 1962–63 season at Wembley Stadium, London on Saturday 11 May 1963, in front of a crowd of 84,492, and was an unused interchange/substitute in Featherstone Rovers' 17-12 victory over Barrow in the 1966–67 Challenge Cup Final during the 1966–67 season at Wembley Stadium, London on Saturday 13 May 1967, in front of a crowd of 76,290.

County Cup Final appearances
Milan Kosanović played  in Wakefield Trinity's 19–9 victory over Leeds in the 1961–62 Yorkshire County Cup Final during the 1961–62 season at Odsal Stadium, Bradford on Saturday 11 November 1961, and played  in Featherstone Rovers' 12-25 defeat by Hull Kingston Rovers in the 1966–67 Yorkshire County Cup Final during the 1966–67 season at Headingley Rugby Stadium, Leeds on Saturday 15 October 1966.

Club career
Milan Kosanović transferred from Bradford Northern to Wakefield Trinity during June 1961, and he made his début for Wakefield Trinity during August 1961, he transferred from Wakefield Trinity to Featherstone Rovers for £600 during February 1964 (based on inflation, this would be ) (based on increases in average earnings, this would be approximately equivalent to £20,970 in 2017), and he made his début for Featherstone Rovers on Saturday 1 February 1964.

Contemporaneous Article Extract
"M. Kosanović - Signed from Bradford N. during last close season and has been a regular member of the side this campaign. Recently out of action through injury. Represented Yorkshire in 1959. Yugoslav-born but has played all his football in Yorkshire. Age 29."

Milan Kosanovic Cup
The Milan Kosanovic Cup is an international rugby league football competition that is named after Milan Kosanović, it is contested by Russia, Ukraine and Serbia.

Genealogical information
Milan Kosanović's marriage to Sylvia D. (née Leach) was registered during third ¼ 1956 in Halifax district. They had children; Mark S. Kosanović (birth registered during fourth ¼  in Halifax district), and Zoran G. Kosanović (birth registered during third ¼  in Halifax district), as of 2009 the brother's run fish and chip shops at West Vale and Brackenbed, Pellon, Halifax.

References

External links
Statistics at rugbyleagueproject.org
Rugby League Final 1963
(Old - redirects to http://www.rlhp.co.uk/) Photograph "1962 Challenge Cup Semi - Wakefield Trinity won this tight game 9-0 in front of 31,423 spectators. Frank Wilkinson of Wakefield is robbed of a try by Malcolm Dixon and Jackie Fennell of Featherstone. - 01/01/1962" at rlhp.co.uk
(New - "This www.rlhp.co.uk page can’t be found") Photograph "1962 Challenge Cup Semi - Wakefield Trinity won this tight game 9-0 in front of 31,423 spectators. Frank Wilkinson of Wakefield is robbed of a try by Malcolm Dixon and Jackie Fennell of Featherstone. - 01/01/1962" at rlhp.co.uk
(New - without %20 - "This www.rlhp.co.uk page can’t be found") Photograph "1962 Challenge Cup Semi - Wakefield Trinity won this tight game 9-0 in front of 31,423 spectators. Frank Wilkinson of Wakefield is robbed of a try by Malcolm Dixon and Jackie Fennell of Featherstone. - 01/01/1962" at rlhp.co.uk
(Thumbnail) Photograph "1962 Challenge Cup Semi - Wakefield Trinity won this tight game 9-0 in front of 31,423 spectators. Frank Wilkinson of Wakefield is robbed of a try by Malcolm Dixon and Jackie Fennell of Featherstone. - 01/01/1962" at rlhp.co.uk
Hooking role a tough one to call
Milan Kosanovic

1932 births
1989 deaths
Bradford Bulls players
Featherstone Rovers players
People from Lika
Rugby league hookers
Serbian rugby league players
Wakefield Trinity players
Yorkshire rugby league team players
Yugoslav emigrants to the United Kingdom